Konshisha is a local government area of Benue State, Nigeria. Its headquarters are in the town of Tse-Agberagba.
 
It has an area of 1,673 km and a population of 225,672 at the 2006 census.  The area is  majorly populated by members of the Tiv ethnic group. The Tiv language is widely spoken in the area while Christianity and Islam are the commonly practiced religions in the area.

The postal code of the area is 971.

History 
Konshisha Local Government is named after River Konshisha which originates in Gboko Local Government and the headquarters is named after Late Pa Agberagba Yonkyo, who founded a significant market in the area.

Konshisha Local Government was formed on February 28, 1983, out of former Vandeikya Local Government Area in Benue State.

However, the military government that took office at the moment in 1984 abolished the Local Government. On February 4, 1989, the General Ibrahim Bagandiga Administration decided to re-establish it.

Notable people 
 Barnabas Gemade
 Joseph Akaagerger

Geography 
Konshisha Local Government Area is located on a levelled land in the North East of Benue State lying between longitude 8o 400 East and Latitude 6o551 and 7o 231 North.

With a total area of 1,673 square kilometers and an average temperature of 28 degrees Celsius, Konshisha LGA is quite large. Numerous bodies of water, like the Konshisha River and Beraba Lake, are found in the region. A number of mountains, including the Selagi and Agila mountains, are also found in the Konshisha LGA's landscape.

Boundaries 
Konshisha is bounded in the North by Gboko Local Government Area, Gwer Local Government Area in the west

Ushongo Local Government Area and Vandeikya Local Government Area in the East And,

Cross River in the South.

Economy of Konshisha 
The majority of people in Konshisha LGA work in agriculture, and yam, cassava, rice, guinea corn, and soya beans are among the crops that are extensively farmed there. Trade is thriving in the region as well, and the LGA is home to a number of marketplaces where a diverse range of goods are bought and sold. The residents of Konshisha LGA also engage in quarrying, food processing, and hunting as significant economic activities.

In a similar vein, the populace does raise livestock. Goats, pigs, birds, Fulani cattle, and a variety of other domestic animals are some of the livestock raised in the area.

Towns and villages in Konshisha 
Tse-Agberagba

Gungul

Korinya

Mbavaa

Aba

Abagi

Aduu

Agen

Shikiri

Shom

Tor Mkar

Tsue

Yogbo

Yande

Ya-Akur

Tile

Talvough

Shan-Gevtie

Council wards in Konshisha 
Konshisha Local Government has eleven (11) Council Wards/Districts, which are:

 Mbaiwarnyam Council Ward
 Mbatsen Council Ward
 Ikyurav/Mbatwer Council Ward
 Mbayegh/Mbaikyer Council Ward
 Tse-Agberagba Council Ward
 Mbavaa Council Ward
 Mbanor Council Ward
 Mbatser/Mbagusa Council Ward
 Mbake Council Ward
 Mbawar Council Ward
 Mbaikyase Council Ward

Konshisha local government has 212 polling units across the 11 districts of Gaav and Shangev-Tiev.

Arts and culture 
Music composers and singers:

 Late Paul Deunav
 Jasper
 Vandelun Baja

Cultural dances:

 Kyureke
 Ingyinga
 Ingyough
 Takera

References

Local Government Areas in Benue State